Kanij Kola (also Romanized as Kanīj Kolā and Kanīj Kalā) is a village in Sorkhkola Rural District, in the Central District of Savadkuh County, Mazandaran Province, Iran. At the 2006 census, its population was 86, in 26 families.

References 

Populated places in Savadkuh County